Parr is an unincorporated community in Union Township, Jasper County, Indiana, United States.

History
Parr was made a station on the railroad built through that territory in the early 1880s. A post office was established at Parr in 1893, and remained in operation until it was discontinued in 1968.

Geography

References

Unincorporated communities in Jasper County, Indiana
Unincorporated communities in Indiana